Badaga may refer to:
 Badagas, an indigenous people inhabiting the Nilgiri Hills of Tamil Nadu, India
 Badaga language, spoken by the Badagas
 Badaga cinema, the Badaga language film industry based in Udagamandalam in Tamil Nadu, India
 Badaganadu, a Brahmin community that resides primarily in Karnataka

Language and nationality disambiguation pages